De Bohemia is the title of a studio album released by Colombian performer Charlie Zaa. This album is a tribute to Cuban performer Orlando Contreras, and was recorded by Zaa after his temporary retirement from the music business, where he was admitted to a clinic to treat problems with panic attacks and depression. Zaa recorded the album after being convinced by his wife to do so.

The album debuted at number 38 in the Billboard Latin Albums chart the week of October 8, 2011. Five weeks later the album jumped from twenty to number-one, becoming Zaa's second chart topper, following his debut album in 1997. De Bohemia also replaced Prince Royce's self-titled debut album at the top of the Tropical Albums chart.

Track listing
This track listing adapted from Allmusic.

Personnel
 Jorge Hugo Alvarez — 	piano
 Jaime Atencia — mixing
 Mauricio Daltaire — maracas
Source:

Sales and certifications

See also
 List of number-one Billboard Latin Albums from the 2010s

References

2011 albums
Charlie Zaa albums
Spanish-language albums
Tribute albums